The 1961 Georgia Bulldogs football team represented the Georgia Bulldogs of the University of Georgia during the 1961 NCAA University Division football season. The Bulldogs completed the season with a 3–7 record.

Schedule

Source: GeorgiaDogs.com: 1961 football schedule

References

Georgia
Georgia Bulldogs football seasons
Georgia Bulldogs football